Cross Channel may refer to:

 Cross Channel (short story collection), 1996 collection of short stories by Julian Barnes
 Cross Channel (film), 1955 film
 Cross channel (marketing), transmission of content through various media in marketing and interaction design
 Cross Channel (visual novel), an adult interactive visual novel
 Cross-Channel guns in the Second World War, coastal artillery pieces placed on the English Channel coasts
 HVDC Cross-Channel, electric connection that operates under the English Channel
 Crossings of the English Channel, by various means

See also 
 
 Channel Crossing